Scott Innes (born October 1, 1966) is an American voice actor, author, songwriter and radio personality. He is best known for his voice over work in various Warner Bros. and Hanna-Barbera animated films, television shows, video games and commercials, most notably as Scooby-Doo, Shaggy Rogers, Scrappy-Doo, Popeye the Sailor, Fred Flintstone, Barney Rubble, Foghorn Leghorn, Muttley, Bugs Bunny, Yogi Bear and Captain Caveman. He has also provided the voice of Fred Jones, Boo-Boo Bear, Snagglepuss, Papa Smurf, Elroy Jetson, Astro, Quick Draw McGraw, Baba Looey, Elmer Fudd, Spike Bulldog and Ranger Smith in various commercials.

Early life
Innes was born on October 1, 1966, in Poplar Bluff, Missouri.

Career
Innes became the voice of Scooby-Doo between 1998 and 2001 after Don Messick's death in 1997. From 1999 to 2001, he was also the voice of Scooby's best friend and owner Norville "Shaggy" Rogers, as well as in the TV special Scooby-Doo: Behind the Scenes in 1998.

He has however returned to voicing Shaggy Rogers and Scooby-Doo since 2010, but only in certain commercials, such as McDonald's, Halifax, Walmart, as well as a Warner Bros. theme park attraction and in the Scooby-Doo Playmobil shorts for WB Kids, where, in the latter of which and also one of the McDonald's commercials, he also provided the voice of Fred Jones. He also voiced Scooby's nephew Scrappy-Doo in the live action movie Scooby-Doo (2002), commercials, toys and the Harvey Birdman, Attorney at Law episode Shaggy Busted.

He voiced Astro from The Jetsons in a series of RadioShack commercials in the late 1990s and even voiced Fred Flintstone and Barney Rubble in a Toshiba commercial from 2002, and has briefly voiced Yogi Bear, Boo-Boo Bear, Ranger Smith, Wally Gator, Quick Draw McGraw, Bugs Bunny, Elmer Fudd, Foghorn Leghorn, Muttley, Snagglepuss, Captain Caveman, Droopy and Papa Smurf. Innes auditioned to return as Shaggy for the television series Scooby-Doo! Mystery Incorporated, but he lost the role to Matthew Lillard, who previously portrayed Shaggy in the 2002 film and its sequel Scooby-Doo 2: Monsters Unleashed (2004).

He wrote the song "Handprints on the Wall", which was recorded by Kenny Rogers.

In-between his voice acting duties, Innes was the afternoon air personality at Country outlet WYNK-FM/Baton Rouge, Louisiana from 1997 to 2011, and joined nearby station WRKN in the same position on April 21, 2016. Innes is currently the publisher and author of Hug magazine since 2010.

Personal life
Innes married his first wife, Jodie, on October 30, 1998. They divorced in 2014; together they have a son, Presley. Innes also has an older son named Josh, who works as a sports radio talk host in Houston, Texas. Innes married his second wife, Cindy Harris, in September 2016.

Filmography

Film

Television

Video games

Live-action

Web

Theme parks

Commercials
 Radio Shack - Astro Jetson
 Campbell Soup - Popeye
 Cartoon Network bumpers - Scooby-Doo, Norville "Shaggy" Rogers, Scrappy-Doo
 Passport commercial - Scooby-Doo, Captain Caveman, Muttley
 Post Cereal Ad - Scooby-Doo
 Kraft Pasta - Scooby-Doo, Norville "Shaggy" Rogers
 Toshiba - Fred Flintstone, Barney Rubble, George Jetson
 Airheads - Scooby-Doo, Norville "Shaggy" Rogers
 McDonald's - Scooby-Doo, Norville "Shaggy" Rogers, Fred Jones
 Chia Pet - Scooby-Doo
 Kid Cuisine - Scooby-Doo, Norville "Shaggy" Rogers
 GoGurt - Scooby-Doo, Norville "Shaggy" Rogers
 Plushie and CD-ROM - Scooby-Doo, Norville "Shaggy" Rogers
 Halifax - Scooby-Doo, Norville "Shaggy" Rogers
 Walmart - Scooby-Doo

Songs

References

External links
 Official website of Scott Innes
 One Scott Shop
 

 

1966 births
Living people
20th-century American male actors
21st-century American male actors
American male voice actors
American radio personalities
Male actors from Missouri
People from Baton Rouge, Louisiana
People from Poplar Bluff, Missouri